Breška Vas is a small settlement on the right bank of the Krka River in the Municipality of Šentjernej in southeastern Slovenia. The area is part of the traditional region of Lower Carniola. It is now included in the Southeast Slovenia Statistical Region.

Name
Breška Vas was attested in written sources as Nabrego in 1251, Stad in 1306, Passagio  1306, Gestad in 1392, Furt der verg between 1395 and 1396, and vrfar in 1486, among other spellings. The name Breška vas literally means 'river bank village'; the adjective breška is derived from the Slovene common noun breg 'river bank'.

References

External links
Breška Vas on Geopedia

Populated places in the Municipality of Šentjernej